Der Giftpilz is a piece of antisemitic Nazi propaganda published as a children's book by Julius Streicher in 1938. The title is German for "the poisonous mushroom/toadstool".

After the war, Streicher was convicted of being an accessory for crimes against humanity in the Nuremberg trials and executed in 1946.

Contents

The text is by Ernst Hiemer, with illustrations by Philipp Rupprecht (also known as Fips); the title alludes to how, just as it is difficult to tell a poisonous mushroom from an edible mushroom, it is difficult to tell a Jew apart from a Gentile. The book attempts to "warn" German children about the dangers allegedly posed by Jews to them personally, and to German society in general.

Antisemitism
The book explains that the Talmud discourages Jews from performing manual labour and encourages them to engage in trade instead; that it teaches Jews that non-Jews are meant to be slaves and asks Jews to enslave the non-Jewish population; and that Talmudic law allows Jews to cheat non-Jews.

The book was sometimes used in German schools. A copy of the book is held by the U.S. Holocaust Memorial Museum in Washington, D.C.

An English-language translation of the book was produced by U.S. neo-Nazi activist Gary Lauck, and thereafter marketed on his website for $10. Lauck also produced an Estonian-language translation in 2007, and claims to be working on translations into many other languages. The Estonian Internal Security Service has investigated the case under the section of Estonian penal code criminalizing incitement to social hatred, but concluded that it is unlikely to have the jurisdiction or means to prosecute the author, as under American law, websites are covered by the First Amendment to the United States Constitution.

See also 
 The Protocols of the Elders of Zion

References

External links
Images and selected translated text from Der Giftpilz.
Complete book in English

1938 children's books
Nazi propaganda
Picture books
German children's literature
Antisemitism in literature
1938 in Judaism
Nazi books